Emiliana Nchama Ndong Angono (born 24 October 1986) is an Equatorial Guinean footballer who plays as a goalkeeper for Malabo Kings FC and the Equatorial Guinea women's national team.

International career
Nchama competed for Equatorial Guinea at the 2018 Africa Women Cup of Nations, playing in two matches.

References

External links

1986 births
Living people
People from Centro Sur
Equatoguinean women's footballers
Women's association football goalkeepers
Equatorial Guinea women's international footballers